Tinotenda Confidence Mutombodzi (born 21 December 1990) is a Zimbabwean cricketer. He began his career as a leg-spin bowler, but now plays principally as a batsman. He made his One Day International debut against the West Indies in February 2013, and his T20 International debut in March 2013.

Early and domestic career 
Mutombodzi was born in Harare. At the age of nine, he took up cricket and represented Zimbabwe's Under-13 and Under-16 teams. He was part of the Zimbabwe's Under-19 side in the 2008 Under-19 World Cup and also Zimbabwe's Under-19 Side that toured New Zealand in 2010. His performances in the Under-19 side included scoring 43 against Pakistan Under-19 team in an unofficial ODI and also picking up 4/27 against the same side in the same series.

He was the highest scorer in Zimbabwe's 2014–15 season, scoring 630 runs for Mashonaland Eagles at an average of 39.37. He also made the only double-century of the season when he scored 230 against Mountaineers. He and Mark Pettini added 352 for the third wicket, breaking the Zimbabwe domestic all-wicket record.

He was the leading wicket-taker in the 2017–18 Logan Cup for Mashonaland Eagles, with 21 dismissals in seven matches. In September 2018, he was named in Zimbabwe's squad for the 2018 Africa T20 Cup tournament.

In December 2020, he was selected to play for the Eagles in the 2020–21 Logan Cup.

International career 
Mutombodzi was named in the 24-man squad for the West Indian tour. He replaced Prosper Utseya in the third ODI. He scored 13 runs until he was run out by Dwayne Bravo. He was the best bowler in the Match for Zimbabwe, picking up 2/35 in his ten overs with a good economy rate of 3.50 runs per over. He made his T20 debut on March 2, 2013. It was not as good as his ODI debut, as he just made 2 runs and went for 0–20 in his two overs. In the next T20, he took his first T20 wickets, with figures of 2-28 from his four overs.

Mutombodzi was named in a 21-man squad against Bangladesh at home. He played the first T20I, scoring 12 not out from 9 balls and had figures of 0–33 in 4 overs. He also was involved in two run outs during the match, which Zimbabwe won by 6 runs.

In January 2020, Mutombodzi was added to Zimbabwe's Test squad for the second Test against Sri Lanka. He made his Test debut for Zimbabwe, against Sri Lanka, on 27 January 2020.

References

External links

Living people
1990 births
Zimbabwean cricketers
Zimbabwe Test cricketers
Zimbabwe One Day International cricketers
Zimbabwe Twenty20 International cricketers
Sportspeople from Harare